The Old Merchants and Farmers Bank Building, also known as the Old Public Library, is a historic bank building located at Emporia, Virginia. It was built in 1902, and is a one-story, eclectic, red and yellow brick structure with a concave mansard roof.  The front facade features a galvanized sheet-metal cornice that may have been manufactured by H. T. Klugel. The bank occupied the building until 1914, after which it housed the public library until 1977.  It is currently occupied by the Greensville-Emporia Historical Museum.

It was listed on the National Register of Historic Places in 1979. The former bank is also located within the Hicksford–Emporia Historic District.

References

Bank buildings on the National Register of Historic Places in Virginia
Commercial buildings completed in 1914
Buildings and structures in Emporia, Virginia
National Register of Historic Places in Emporia, Virginia
1914 establishments in Virginia
Individually listed contributing properties to historic districts on the National Register in Virginia